Latvia competed at the 2006 Winter Olympics in Turin, Italy.  Mārtiņš Rubenis won Latvia's first Winter Olympic medal.

Medalists

Alpine skiing 

Note: In the men's combined, run 1 is the downhill, and runs 2 and 3 are the slalom. In the women's combined, run 1 and 2 are the slalom, and run 3 the downhill.

Biathlon 

Men

Women

Bobsleigh

Cross-country skiing 

Distance

Sprint

Ice hockey

Men's tournament

Players

Round-robin

Luge

Short track speed skating

Skeleton

References

 

Nations at the 2006 Winter Olympics
2006
Winter Olympics